In Greek mythology, Creusa (Kreousa "princess") may refer to the following figures:
 Creusa, a naiad daughter of Gaia.
Creusa, daughter of Erechtheus, King of Athens and his wife, Praxithea.
Creusa, also known by the name Glauce, was the daughter of King Creon of Corinth, Greece.
 Creusa, an Amazon spearwoman in a painting on a vase from Cumae that depicts a battle of the Amazons against Theseus and his army; she is portrayed as being overcome by Phylacus.
Creusa, daughter of Priam and Hecuba, was the first wife of Aeneas and mother to Ascanius (also known as Iulus)
 Creusa, wife of the Carian Cassandrus and mother by him of Menes. Her son was killed by Neoptolemus in the Trojan War.
 Creusa, a misnomer for Keroessa in the Etymologicum Magnum.

Notes

References 

 Diodorus Siculus, The Library of History translated by Charles Henry Oldfather. Twelve volumes. Loeb Classical Library. Cambridge, Massachusetts: Harvard University Press; London: William Heinemann, Ltd. 1989. Vol. 3. Books 4.59–8. Online version at Bill Thayer's Website
 Diodorus Siculus, Bibliotheca Historica. Vol 1-2. Immanel Bekker. Ludwig Dindorf. Friedrich Vogel. In aedibus B. G. Teubneri. Leipzig. 1888–1890. Greek text available at the Perseus Digital Library.
 Gaius Julius Hyginus, Fabulae from The Myths of Hyginus translated and edited by Mary Grant. University of Kansas Publications in Humanistic Studies. Online version at the Topos Text Project.
 Pindar, Odes translated by Diane Arnson Svarlien. 1990. Online version at the Perseus Digital Library.
 Pindar, The Odes of Pindar including the Principal Fragments with an Introduction and an English Translation by Sir John Sandys, Litt.D., FBA. Cambridge, MA., Harvard University Press; London, William Heinemann Ltd. 1937. Greek text available at the Perseus Digital Library.
 Pseudo-Apollodorus, The Library with an English Translation by Sir James George Frazer, F.B.A., F.R.S. in 2 Volumes, Cambridge, MA, Harvard University Press; London, William Heinemann Ltd. 1921. Online version at the Perseus Digital Library. Greek text available from the same website.
 Quintus Smyrnaeus, The Fall of Troy translated by Way. A. S. Loeb Classical Library, Volume 19. London: William Heinemann, 1913. Online version at theio.com
 Quintus Smyrnaeus, The Fall of Troy. Arthur S. Way. London: William Heinemann; New York: G.P. Putnam's Sons. 1913. Greek text available at the Perseus Digital Library.
 Wilhelm Heinrich Roscher (ed.): Ausführliches Lexikon der griechischen und römischen Mythologie. Band 2.1 (I-K), Leipzig, 1890–1894, ss. 1425 - 1429

Amazons (Greek mythology)
Naiads
bn:ক্রেউসা (এরেখথেউসের কন্যা)